James E. Briles (March 31, 1926 - July 11, 1992) was an American Republican politician. He served as a member of the Iowa House of Representatives from 1957 to 1965, and the Iowa Senate from 1965 to 1984.

References

1926 births
1992 deaths
People from Adams County, Iowa
Republican Party members of the Iowa House of Representatives
Republican Party Iowa state senators
20th-century American politicians